The Walchensee Power Plant is a hydroelectric power station in Bavaria, Germany. It is a storage power station that is fed water from the Walchensee which is then released into the Kochelsee. The installed capacity is 124 MW with an annual production of 300 GWh. It is one of the largest of its kind in Germany and has been owned by Uniper Kraftwerke GmbH since 2016.

Technical operation

Through six,  ducts connecting the two natural lakes, the water flows to the hydro-electric plant's four Pelton water turbines with single-phase generators, and four Francis water turbines with three-phase generators, and then exits into the Kochelsee. Because the water level constantly changes, neither lake fully freezes in the winter; what does freeze on the lakes is potentially hazardous thin ice. The natural outflow of the Walchensee at Niedernach — over the Jachen to the River Isar — is blocked by a weir, but the natural inflow to the lake is still insufficient to provide enough water to the reservoir for the operation of the power station, so the waters of the Rißbach river are also used.

Isar transfer
The Isar, which flows as a whitewater river from the Austrian part of the Karwendel mountains, is dammed between Mittenwald and Krün by a weir to form the Krüner Isar reservoir and is then diverted to the Walchensee. This water flows past the Krün hydroelectric plant in an open channel, through a culvert, under the B 11 road at Wallgau and then via a tunnel to the Sachensee lake. Here a 3.9 kilometer long penstock begins.

Rißbach transfer
The Rißbach comes from the northern part of the Karwendel mountains, where it gathers the water of smaller streams in the Ahornboden area. After crossing the border between Tirol and Bavaria, and immediately after the inlet of the Fermersbach, a 6960 m lug carries water to the hydro-electric power plant at Niedernach at the southeast end of the Walchensee. The power station has been in operation since 1951.

Distinctive features
The main road from the village of Walchensee to Urfeld runs below the steep slopes of the Herzogstand. Construction had to withstand the pressure exerted by the Walchensee on the embankment, so that the road did not slide away. If the water level in winter falls due to outflow through the Walchensee power station, use of the road by trucks is limited by weight restrictions. In spring plant operators are obligated to increase the water level again in such a way that traffic restrictions — primarily affecting tourism — can be lifted or penalties are imposed. During winter operators must monitor the snow accumulated in the catchment area to calculate the amount of melt water expected and to comply with water level requirements. , the Walchensee, along with other Bavarian power stations in the region, produce 1.3 TWh of renewable electricity annually, i.e. the supply of close to 400,000 Bavarian households.

History
Oskar von Miller was the developer and designer of the Walchensee power station. It was initially intended to support the electrification of the Bavarian railways, but the project was suspended by the Bavarian parliament in 1912. It was believed too much electric power would be generated and the economic benefits were in doubt. In 1915, von Miller suggested integrating the proposed power station into the region's power grid and the state-owned power supply company Bayernwerk. The Bavarian parliament agreed to the construction of the power plant in 1918. Construction began in December 1918 and in 1924 the plant began producing electrical power. The problem of transporting that power over long distances was solved with the introduction of overhead power lines. From the outset, demand for power was so great that hydroelectricity could only provide a third of the required output, with the balance being supplied by traction engines. The plant was originally owned by the state-owned Bayernwerk AG (Bavarian Works Company). Bayernwerk was later denationalised and taken over by VIAG (Vereinigte Industrieunternehmungen) and as a result the power station is now operated by E.ON Wasserkraft GmbH.

World War II wind tunnel
To develop Nazi Germany's planned A10 rocket, a new Mach 10 wind tunnel was planned at the power station. The new power plant was to use the 202 meter difference from the Walchensee down to the Kochelsee to generate 120 megawatts. However, instead of a new wind tunnel and power plant, the Mach 4.4 wind tunnel used for V-2 rocket development was moved to the site following the 1943 Operation Hydra bombing of Peenemünde, and the new powerplant was completed after the war. The wind tunnel was moved to White Oak, Maryland, after the war.

Notes

External links

Buildings and structures in Bad Tölz-Wolfratshausen
Energy infrastructure completed in 1924
Hydroelectric power stations in Germany